Aroostook State Park is public recreation area within the southern municipal boundary of the city of Presque Isle in Aroostook County, Maine. The state park's  encompass Quaggy Jo Mountain and sit adjacent to Echo Lake. "Quaggy Jo" is an altered version of the mountain's Native American name, "Qua Qua Jo", which means "twin-peaked."

The park is off U.S. Route 1 on the south side of Presque Isle.

The park is 1 of 5 Maine State Parks that are in the path of totality for the 2024 solar eclipse, with 3 minutes and 1 second of totality.

History
The park was formed in 1938 as the first of Maine's state parks three years after the creation of the Maine State Park Commission. The park's first ski runs were built by a 35-member crew from the Works Progress Administration.

Wildlife 
While the park's forest provides a home for black bear and moose, smaller species such as foxes, squirrels, and chipmunks are more commonly seen by visitors. The forest's mix of hardwood trees and cold-tolerant softwoods typical of northern Maine includes various species of ash, maple, and birch, as well as hophornbeam, quaking aspen, American beech, and balsam fir. Common birds include hawks, owls, and woodpeckers. Brook trout are found in Echo Lake.

Activities and amenities
The park offers a 30-site campground and trails for hiking, cross-country skiing, and snowshoeing. Swimming, fishing, and canoeing are offered on Echo Lake.

References

External links
Aroostook State Park Department of Agriculture, Conservation and Forestry
Aroostook State Park Guide & Map Department of Agriculture, Conservation and Forestry

State parks of Maine
Protected areas of Aroostook County, Maine
Protected areas established in 1938
Works Progress Administration in Maine
1938 establishments in Maine
Presque Isle, Maine
Campgrounds in Maine